Dead Air for Radios studio album by Kevin Moore, under the musical moniker Chroma Key. It was released through Fight Evil Records on December 16, 1998. The album was recorded by Steve Tushar at Bill's Place Rehearsal Studio in Hollywood, mixed by both Steve Tushar and Kevin Moore with final mastering by Eddy Schreyer. Since its release the album has sold around 10,000 copies.

Themes
The voice of a woman repeating words and numbers in German during "Even the Waves" is from a famous numbers station broadcast on shortwave frequencies. "S.O.S." was one of the first songs Moore wrote for the album. The spoken sample is of a German man Moore met in Santa Fe who described his experiences of hitch-hiking from LA to Santa Fe.

Track listing

Personnel

Musicians
Kevin Moore - vocals, keyboards, bass
Mark Zonder - drums
Jason Anderson - guitars
Joey Vera - bass on tracks 3, 4, and 5

Production
 Kevin Moore - artwork, producer, mixing
 Steve Tushar - engineering
 Eddy Schreyer - mastering
 Steve Tushar - producer, mixing
 Esther Mera - artwork

References

External links
 Official site  where the entire album is available to listen

Chroma Key albums
1998 albums